Bandel Junction railway station is one of the junction stations of the Kolkata Suburban Railway network, India. It is situated on the Howrah–Bandel–Barddhaman main line in Hooghly district with an approximate  distance from Howrah railway station. The station is operated by the Howrah railway division. There are seven platforms (1, 2, 3, 4, 5, 6, and 7) at Bandel Junction station. However, platform number 6 can accommodate only the 9-coach EMU trains so most of the 9-coach Bandel–Naihati locals depart from that platform. Bandel station is also connected to the Sealdah railway division by the Bandel–Naihati line.

See also
 Howrah railway station
 Sealdah
 Bandel
 Kolkata Suburban Railway

References

External links

Railway junction stations in West Bengal
Railway stations in Hooghly district
Kolkata Suburban Railway stations
Howrah railway division